Mimi Hughes is an American long-distance swimmer who began her long-distance swims by crossing the Bering Strait. She has since swum the lengths of the Tennessee, Danube, Drava, and Mura Rivers. Mimi dedicates her swims to a variety of causes: understanding between nations (the Bering Strait), environmental awareness (Tennessee, Danube, Drava, and Mura Rivers), and lifeskills' training and education for women and girls (Ohio River, 2010).

Declared one of the most important women of the last 100 years by Für Sie magazine, Mimi's philosophy encourages each individual to envision change and then take action.

References

External links 
Mimi's Swim page Ning site

Living people
Year of birth missing (living people)
American female swimmers
Female long-distance swimmers
21st-century American women